Veliki Gaber is a village in the Municipality of Trebnje in eastern Slovenia. It lies just north of the Slovenian A2 motorway east of Ivančna Gorica. The area is part of the historical Lower Carniola region. The municipality is now included in the Southeast Slovenia Statistical Region.

Church

The local parish church is dedicated to Saint Ulrich and belongs to the Roman Catholic Diocese of Novo Mesto. It was built in 1910 on the site of a 17th-century predecessor.

Gallery

References

External links

Veliki Gaber at Geopedia

Populated places in the Municipality of Trebnje